Chwarel y Fan is a peak in the Black Mountains in south-eastern Wales. It is the highest rise on the long ridge which extends southeastwards from Rhos Dirion. Chwarel y Fan is the county top of the historic county of Monmouthshire, and is also the highest point in the current local government area of Monmouthshire.

The summit is on a thin ridge and is crowned by a cairn. On the other sides of the valleys: to the west is Pen Twyn Mawr and to the east is Black Mountain.

References

External links
www.geograph.co.uk : photos of Waun Fach and surrounding area

Black Mountains, Wales
Mountains and hills of Powys
Hewitts of Wales
Nuttalls
Highest points of Welsh counties